Shennongtherium is an extinct genus of rhinoceros from the Miocene time period. It once roamed in what is now China.

It was originally classified in the subfamily Elasmotheriinae, but has since been found to be closer to true rhinoceros.

References

Miocene rhinoceroses
Fossils of China
Miocene mammals of Asia